Gilded Latten Bones is a fantasy novel by American writer Glen Cook, the thirteenth novel in his ongoing Garrett P.I. series.  The series combines elements of mystery and fantasy as it follows the adventures of private investigator Garrett.

Characters  
Garrett
The Dead Man
Dean
Pular Singe
Saucerhead Tharpe
Morley Dotes
Belinda Contague
Playmate
John Stretch
General Westman Block
Deal Relway
Winger
Tinnie Tate
Max Weider
 Alyx Weider
 Strafa Algarda (Windwalker Furious Tide of Light)
Kip Prose
 Pilsuds Vilchik (aka Jon Salvation)

Garrett P.I.
2010 American novels
American fantasy novels
Roc Books books